The onefin catshark (Pentanchus profundicolus) is a species of catshark, and part of the family Scyliorhinidae. It is the only member of its genus.

References

 

onefin catshark
Fish of the Philippines
onefin catshark